George John Kisiday (April 16, 1923 – November 8, 1970) was an American football player who played at the end position. He played college football for Duquesne and Columbia and professional football for the Buffalo Bills and Jersey City Giants.

Early years
Kisiday was born in 1923 in Ambridge, Pennsylvania. He attended and played football at Ambridge High School.

College football and military service
Kisiday played college football for Duquesne at the end position in 1942 and 1947. His college career was interrupted by service in the United States Army during World War II. He transferred to Columbia in 1947 and played at the tackle position for Lou Little's 1947 Columbia Lions football team that was ranked No. 20 in the final AP Poll.

Professional football
He was selected by the New York Giants in the 22nd round (196th overall pick) of the 1947 NFL Draft but did not play for the Giants. Kisiday instead signed in February 1948 to play for the Buffalo Bills of the All-America Football Conference (AAFC). He was recommended to the Bills by Columbia coach Little. He played for the Bills  during their 1948 season and appeared in 14 games. He also played in the American Football League for the Jersey City Giants in 1949.

Family and later years
After his playing career ended, he was hired as an assistant football coach at North Catholic High School in Pittsburgh. He later served as the line coach at the University of Bridgeport. After his coaching career, he served as the recreation director in Ambridge. 

Kisiday suffered a heart attack in 1962. He subsequently died of an apparent heart attack in 1970 at age 47 in Ambridge.

References

1923 births
1970 deaths
Buffalo Bills (AAFC) players
Duquesne Dukes football players
Columbia Lions football players
Players of American football from Pennsylvania
People from Ambridge, Pennsylvania
American football ends
United States Army personnel of World War II